Patalamon Mesa is a flat-topped mountain rising to about 700 m west of Hidden Lake, in the western portion of James Ross Island. In association with nearby Kerick Col, named by the United Kingdom Antarctic Place-Names Committee (UK-APC) in 1987 after Patalamon, son of Kerick Booterin, in Rudyard Kipling's story The White Seal in The Jungle Book.

Mesas of Antarctica
Landforms of Graham Land
Landforms of James Ross Island